The Angel and the Woman is a 1977 Canadian fantasy romance film directed by Gilles Carle and starring Carole Laure, Lewis Furey, and Stephen Lack. The film follows a woman who, after being brutally shot, dies in the snow and is resurrected by an angel who falls in love with her and eventually teaches her how to incinerate objects with her mind. The film is shot entirely in black-and-white and gained some controversy due to its explicit unsimulated sex scenes between the two leads.

Cast

Production
This film contains non-simulated sexual acts (vaginal penetration, fellatio and ejaculation) between the two main actors, Carole Laure and Lewis Furey. It is a fact that at the beginning of filming Laure was director Gilles Carle's girlfriend. In Carle's intentions, the sex act between Laure and Furey was supposed to remain a one-off, but in fact the two actors fell in love during filming, moved in together and later married.

See also
 List of films about angels

References

External links
 
 

1977 films
1970s fantasy drama films
1977 romantic drama films
1970s French-language films
1970s English-language films
English-language Canadian films
1970s romantic fantasy films
Canadian romantic fantasy films
Canadian fantasy drama films
Films set in Quebec
Films shot in Quebec
Films about angels
Fictional angels
Films directed by Gilles Carle
1977 multilingual films
Canadian multilingual films
1970s Canadian films